Mary Nelson Archambaud (born Mary Alice Nelson; Penobscot pronunciation: Molly Dellis), best known by her stage name Molly Spotted Elk, was a Penobscot Indian dancer, actress, and writer who was born on the Penobscot Indian Island Reservation, in Maine, U.S.

Biography
Born November 17, 1903, on Indian Island, a Penobscot Reservation near Old Town, Maine, Spotted Elk was christened Mary Alice Nelson by a Catholic priest, but the Penobscot pronounced her first and middle names Molly Dellis, which was often shortened to Molly Dell or Molly. Her parents were Horace Nelson, a Penobscot political leader, and her mother Philomene Saulis Nelson (1888–1977), an artisan basket maker who sold her crafts to tourists. Her father was the first Penobscot to go to Dartmouth College. There, he studied for a year and became a governor of the tribe. Molly was the oldest of eight children. All of them helped their parents sell the famous baskets Philomene made in tourist towns. In addition to that, Molly learned traditional dances and performed for tourists who stayed at hotels.

Spotted Elk was involved in Vaudeville shows at various times interspersed with her early education. She attended the University of Pennsylvania under the sponsorship of Frank Speck. Due to a lack of funds, she was only able to attend the prestigious college for two years, and then returned to touring, and dancing her tribe’s native dances. Although she had returned to her life as a performer, she did not let this crush her spirits and she began to write and create her own music and costumes. Her family is said to have described her as “A happy and completely free spirit.”  

Spotted Elk's career is marked by a tension between her desire for fame and success as an actress and performer, and the racist expectations of White American and European society that forced her to don skimpy buckskin costumes and act out stereotypes in order to do so. Returning to rural Maine after living in New York and Paris, wrote her biographer, "was like an old pair of moccasins that one dreamed of during years of high-heeled city life—only to find, upon slipping into them, that they felt less comfortable than remembered because the shape of one's feet had changed."

Her granddaughter is the Penobscot artist, activist and basketweaver Theresa Secord.

Work life

She performed with Miller Brothers' 101 Ranch both on tour and in Oklahoma. It was as a result of winning a dance competition of Natives Americans in Oklahoma that she was adopted by the Cheyenne and given the name of Spotted Elk.

In 1926, Elk moved to New York looking for opportunities, fame, and fortune. She had different jobs to save money for school such as a nude model, dance teacher, and more.

After a lot of practice, she won a role in the chorus line of the Foster Girls. They traveled to San Antonio for eight months to perform at the Aztec. There, she decide to pursue a writing career, so when she was not dancing, she was writing poetry, adventure stories, literary fiction, and more. After the tour was done, she went back to New York where she continued working.

She starred in The Silent Enemy, a 1930 silent-film drama of American Indian life. Sometimes she worked as an artists' model; among the artists for whom she modeled was Bonnie MacLeary.

Life in Paris

In 1931, she moved to Paris, France, where she found an audience for traditional Native American dance. While there, she met and married French journalist Jean Archambaud. At this time she began researching the folktales and traditions of the Native American northeast.

In 1933, the Depression affected Paris. As a result she had less opportunities to dance, and Archambaud was fired from his job. In 1934, she moved to New York where she had a few jobs; she was pregnant and gave birth there. In 1938, Elk and her daughter moved back to Paris to be reunited with Archambaud. However, their happiness lasted only a short while; the Nazis invaded and she and her daughter were separated from Archambaud. They never saw him again. Together mother and child crossed the Pyrenees Mountains on foot to Spain. From there they returned to the United States, where Elk spent the rest of her life on the Penobscot Reservation.

Bibliography
 Molly Spotted Elk (2003) Katahdin: Wigwam's Tales of the Abnaki Tribe and a Dictionary of Penobscot and Passamaquoddy Words with French and English Translation, Maine Folklife Center, .

References

External links
 The collection of Molly Spotted Elk material formerly held at the Maine Folklife Center was transferred to  Raymond H. Fogler Library at the University of Maine in 2017.
 

1903 births
1977 deaths
American film actresses
American silent film actresses
American female dancers
University of Pennsylvania alumni
Native American actresses
Native American dancers
People from Penobscot Indian Island Reservation
Penobscot people
20th-century American actresses
American expatriate actresses in France
Native American Roman Catholics
20th-century Native Americans
Dancers from Maine
Catholics from Maine
20th-century American dancers
20th-century Native American women